Tenaturris dysoni, common name Dyson's mangelia, is a species of sea snail, a marine gastropod mollusk in the family Mangeliidae.

Description
The length of the shell varies between 5 mm and 12 mm.

(Original description) The ovate shell has a rather short spire. The whorls are rounded at the upper part, longitudinally very closely finely ribbed, decussated with transverse striae. The ribs, being decussated with striae, have a slightly granular appearance. The sinus is broad. The siphonal canal is almosty lacking. The color of the shell is whitish, encircled with two faint bands of orange brown.

Distribution
This species occurs in the Caribbean Sea off Honduras, Colombia and in the Lesser Antilles.

References

External links
 
 

dysoni
Gastropods described in 1846